Nuorbejávri is a lake in the municipality of Kautokeino-Guovdageaidnu in Troms og Finnmark county, Norway.

See also
List of lakes in Norway

References

Kautokeino
Lakes of Troms og Finnmark